The meridian 56° west of Greenwich is a line of longitude that extends from the North Pole across the Arctic Ocean, North America, the Atlantic Ocean, South America, the Southern Ocean, and Antarctica to the South Pole.

The 56th meridian west forms a great circle with the 124th meridian east.

From Pole to Pole
Starting at the North Pole and heading south to the South Pole, the 56th meridian west passes through:

{| class="wikitable plainrowheaders"
! scope="col" width="120" | Co-ordinates
! scope="col" | Country, territory or sea
! scope="col" | Notes
|-
| style="background:#b0e0e6;" | 
! scope="row" style="background:#b0e0e6;" | Arctic Ocean
| style="background:#b0e0e6;" |
|-
| style="background:#b0e0e6;" | 
! scope="row" style="background:#b0e0e6;" | Lincoln Sea
| style="background:#b0e0e6;" |
|-
| 
! scope="row" | 
| Nyeboe Land
|-
| style="background:#b0e0e6;" | 
! scope="row" style="background:#b0e0e6;" | Baffin Bay
| style="background:#b0e0e6;" |
|-
| style="background:#b0e0e6;" | 
! scope="row" style="background:#b0e0e6;" | Davis Strait
| style="background:#b0e0e6;" |
|-
| style="background:#b0e0e6;" | 
! scope="row" style="background:#b0e0e6;" | Atlantic Ocean
| style="background:#b0e0e6;" | Labrador Sea
|-
| 
! scope="row" | 
| Newfoundland and Labrador — Labrador
|-
| style="background:#b0e0e6;" | 
! scope="row" style="background:#b0e0e6;" | Strait of Belle Isle
| style="background:#b0e0e6;" |
|-valign="top"
| 
! scope="row" | 
| Newfoundland and Labrador — Great Northern Peninsula on the island of Newfoundland
|-
| style="background:#b0e0e6;" | 
! scope="row" style="background:#b0e0e6;" | Atlantic Ocean
| style="background:#b0e0e6;" |
|-valign="top"
| 
! scope="row" | 
| Newfoundland and Labrador — island of Newfoundland
|-
| style="background:#b0e0e6;" | 
! scope="row" style="background:#b0e0e6;" | Fortune Bay
| style="background:#b0e0e6;" | Passing just west of Brunette Island, Newfoundland and Labrador,  (at )
|-valign="top"
| 
! scope="row" | 
| Newfoundland and Labrador — the tip of the Burin Peninsula on the island of Newfoundland
|-valign="top"
| style="background:#b0e0e6;" | 
! scope="row" style="background:#b0e0e6;" | Atlantic Ocean
| style="background:#b0e0e6;" | Passing just east of the island of Saint-Pierre,  (at )
|-
| 
! scope="row" | 
|
|-
| 
! scope="row" | 
| Pará
|-
| 
! scope="row" | 
|
|-valign="top"
| 
! scope="row" | 
| Pará Mato Grosso — from  Mato Grosso do Sul — from 
|-
| 
! scope="row" | 
|
|-
| 
! scope="row" | 
|
|-
| 
! scope="row" | 
| Rio Grande do Sul
|-
| 
! scope="row" | 
| Passing just east of Montevideo (at )
|-
| style="background:#b0e0e6;" | 
! scope="row" style="background:#b0e0e6;" | Atlantic Ocean
| style="background:#b0e0e6;" |
|-
| style="background:#b0e0e6;" | 
! scope="row" style="background:#b0e0e6;" | Southern Ocean
| style="background:#b0e0e6;" |
|-valign="top"
| 
! scope="row" | Antarctica
|-
| style="background:#b0e0e6;" | 
! scope="row" style="background:#b0e0e6;" | Southern Ocean
| style="background:#b0e0e6;" | Weddell Sea
|-valign="top"
| 
! scope="row" | Antarctica
|-
|}

See also
55th meridian west
57th meridian west

w056 meridian west